According to the United States Government Accountability Office (GAO), there are 1,138 statutory provisions in which marital status is a factor in determining benefits, rights, and privileges. These rights were a key issue in the debate over federal recognition of same-sex marriage. Under the 1996 Defense of Marriage Act (DOMA), the federal government was prohibited from recognizing same-sex couples who were lawfully married under the laws of their state. The conflict between this definition and the Due Process Clause of the Fifth Amendment to the Constitution led the U.S. Supreme Court to rule DOMA unconstitutional on June 26, 2013, in the case of United States v. Windsor. DOMA was finally repealed and replaced by the Respect for Marriage Act on December 13, 2022, which retains the same statutory provisions as DOMA and extends them to interracial and same-sex married couples. 

Prior to the enactment of DOMA, the GAO identified 1,049 federal statutory provisions in which benefits, rights, and privileges are contingent on marital status or in which marital status is a factor.  An update was published in 2004 by the GAO covering the period between September 21, 1996 (when DOMA was signed into law), and December 31, 2003.  The update identified 120 new statutory provisions involving marital status, and 31 statutory provisions involving marital status repealed or amended in such a way as to eliminate marital status as a factor.

The first legally-recognized same-sex marriage occurred in Minneapolis, Minnesota, in 1971. On June 26, 2015, in the case of Obergefell v. Hodges, the Supreme Court overturned Baker v. Nelson and ruled that marriage is a fundamental right guaranteed to all citizens, and thus legalized same-sex marriage nationwide.

Rights and benefits 
 Right to benefits while married:
 Employment assistance and transitional services for spouses of members being separated from military service; continued commissary privileges 
 Per diem payment to spouse for federal civil service employees when relocating
 Indian Health Service care for spouses of Native Americans (in some circumstances)
 Sponsor husband/wife for immigration benefits
 Larger benefits under some programs if married, including:
 Veteran's disability
 Supplemental Security Income
 Disability payments for federal employees
 Medicaid
 Property tax exemption for homes of totally disabled veterans
 Income tax deductions, credits, rates exemption, and estimates
 Wages of an employee working for one's spouse are exempt from federal unemployment tax
 Joint and family-related rights:
 Joint filing of bankruptcy permitted
 Joint parenting rights, such as access to children's school records 
 Family visitation rights for the spouse and non-biological children, such as to visit a spouse in a hospital or prison 
 Next-of-kin status for emergency medical decisions or filing wrongful death claims 
 Custodial rights to children, shared property, child support, and alimony after divorce 
 Domestic violence intervention 
 Access to "family only" services, such as reduced rate memberships to clubs & organizations or residency in certain neighborhoods 
 Preferential hiring for spouses of veterans in government jobs
 Tax-free transfer of property between spouses (including on death) and exemption from "due-on-sale" clauses.
 Special consideration to spouses of citizens and resident aliens
 Threats against spouses of various federal employees is a federal crime
 Right to continue living on land purchased from spouse by National Park Service when easement granted to spouse
 Court notice of probate proceedings 
 Domestic violence protection orders
 Existing homestead lease continuation of rights 
 Regulation of condominium sales to owner-occupants exemption
 Funeral and bereavement leave 
 Joint adoption and foster care
 Joint filing of taxes (see filing status)
 Insurance licenses, coverage, eligibility, and benefits organization of mutual benefits society 
 Legal status with stepchildren 
 Making spousal medical decisions
 Spousal non-resident tuition differential waiver
 Permission to make funeral arrangements for a deceased spouse, including burial or cremation
 Right of survivorship of custodial trust
 Right to change surname upon marriage
 Right to enter into prenuptial agreement
 Right to inheritance of property 
 Spousal privilege in court cases (the marital confidences privilege and the spousal testimonial privilege)
 For those divorced or widowed, the right to many of ex- or late spouse's benefits, including:
 Social Security pension
 Veteran's pensions, indemnity compensation for service-connected deaths, medical care, and nursing home care, right to burial in veterans' cemeteries, educational assistance, and housing
 survivor benefits for federal employees
 Survivor benefits for spouses of longshoremen, harbor workers, railroad workers
 Additional benefits to spouses of coal miners who die of black lung disease
 $100,000 to spouse of any public safety officer killed in the line of duty
 Continuation of employer-sponsored health benefits
 Renewal and termination rights to spouse's copyrights on death of spouse
 Continued water rights of spouse in some circumstances
 Payment of wages and workers compensation benefits after worker death
 Making, revoking, and objecting to post-mortem anatomical gifts

Responsibilities 
 Spousal income and assets are counted in determining need in many forms of government assistance, including:
 Veteran's medical and home care benefits
 Housing assistance
 Housing loans for veterans
 Child's education loans
 Educational loan repayment schedule
 Agricultural price supports and loans
 Eligibility for federal matching campaign funds
 Ineligible for National Affordable Housing program if spouse ever purchased a home:
 Subject to conflict-of-interest rules for many government and government-related jobs
 Ineligible to receive various survivor benefits upon remarriage
 Providing financial support for raising children born of the marriage

Ambiguous 
There are some laws that either benefit or penalize married couples over single people, depending upon their own circumstances:
 Marriage penalty/bonus
 Changing beneficiaries in a retirement plan or waiving the joint and survivor annuity form of retirement benefit requires written spousal consent
 Wages can be garnished at a maximum of 60% (instead of the normal 25% limit) if the garnishing is for alimony or child support

States 
In addition, community-property states frequently have forms of ownership that allow a full basis step-up on one's own share of community property on the death of a spouse (in addition to the normal step-up on spouse's assets).

Legal remedies enacted following the GAO report
Following the 2004 GAO report at least one bill, the Uniting American Families Act, has been proposed to attempt to remedy some of the differences in rights between same-sex partnerships and marriages.

See also 

 Borelli v. Brusseau
 Community property
 Domestic partnership in the United States
 Respect for Marriage Act
 Federal Marriage Amendment
 Freedom to Marry
 LGBT rights
 Marriage Protection Act
 Rights and obligations of marriage
 Same-sex marriage in the United States
 Same-sex marriage in the United States by state
 Same-sex marriage in the United States public opinion
 Same-sex marriage legislation in the United States
 Same-sex marriage status in the United States by state
 U.S. state constitutional amendments banning same-sex unions

References

Further reading 
 Tax Administration: Income Tax Treatment of Married and Single Individuals. GAO/GGD-96-175, September 3, 1996.

Marriage law in the United States
Discrimination in the United States